The 1965 Pittsburgh Steelers season was the team's 33rd in the National Football League.

The team set a modern NFL record with a minus-30 turnover ratio.

Regular season

Schedule 

Note: Intra-conference opponents are in bold text.

Game summaries

Week 1 (Sunday September 19, 1965): Green Bay Packers 

at Pitt Stadium, Pittsburgh, Pennsylvania

 Game time:
 Game weather:
 Game attendance: 38,383
 Referee:
 TV announcers:

Scoring Drives:

 Pittsburgh – FG Clark 21
 Pittsburgh – FG Clark 34
 Green Bay – Adderley 34 interception (Chandler kick)
 Pittsburgh – FG Clark 32
 Green Bay – Fleming 31 pass from Starr (Chandler kick)
 Green Bay – FG Chandler 9
 Green Bay – FG Chandler 19
 Green Bay – Hornung 10 pass from Starr (Chandler kick)
 Green Bay – Pitts 2 run (Chandler kick)
 Green Bay – Pitts 2 run (Chandler kick)

Week 2 (Sunday September 26, 1965): San Francisco 49ers  

at Kezar Stadium, San Francisco, California

 Game time:
 Game weather:
 Game attendance: 30,140
 Referee:
 TV announcers:

Scoring Drives:

 San Francisco – Crow 49 pass from Brodie (Davis kick)
 Pittsburgh – Hoak 1 run (Clark kick)
 San Francisco – FG Davis 37
 San Francisco – FG Davis 27
 Pittsburgh – FG Clark 32
 San Francisco – Wiltard 9 run (Davis kick)
 Pittsburgh – Campbell 15 fumble return (Clark kick)
 San Francisco – Brodie 4 run (Davis kick)

Week 3 (Sunday October 3, 1965): New York Giants  

at Pitt Stadium, Pittsburgh, Pennsylvania

 Game time:
 Game weather:
 Game attendance: 31,871
 Referee:
 TV announcers:

Scoring Drives:

 New York Giants – Thurlow 6 run (Stynchula kick)
 Pittsburgh – FG Clark 22
 New York Giants – Morrison 4 pass form Morrall (Stynchula kick)
 Pittsburgh – FG Clark 48
 New York Giants – FG Timberlake 43
 Pittsburgh – Hoak 1 run (Clark kick)
 New York Giants – Thomas 29 pass form Morrall (kick failed)

Week 4 (Saturday October 9, 1965): Cleveland Browns  

at Cleveland Municipal Stadium, Cleveland, Ohio

 Game time:
 Game weather:
 Game attendance: 80,187
 Referee:
 TV announcers:

Scoring Drives:

 Cleveland – FG Groza 38
 Cleveland – Brown 4 pass from Ryan (Groza kick)
 Pittsburgh – Nelsen 1 run (kick failed)
 Pittsburgh – Hoak – 42 run (kick failed)
 Cleveland – Brown 1 run (Groza kick)
 Pittsburgh – Hoak 15 run (Clark kick)
 Cleveland – Collins 14 pass from Ryan (Groza kick)

Week 5 (Sunday October 17, 1965): St. Louis Cardinals  

at Pitt Stadium, Pittsburgh, Pennsylvania

 Game time:
 Game weather:
 Game attendance: 31,085
 Referee:
 TV announcers:

Scoring Drives:

 St. Louis – Randle 8 pass from Johnson (Bakken kick)
 Pittsburgh – Ballman 5 run (Clark kick)
 St. Louis – FG Bakken 32
 St. Louis – Conrad 71 pass from Johnson (Bakken kick)
 St. Louis – FG Bakken 35

Week 6 (Sunday October 24, 1965): Philadelphia Eagles  

at Franklin Field, Philadelphia

 Game time:
 Game weather:
 Game attendance: 56,515
 Referee:
 TV announcers:

Scoring Drives:

 Philadelphia – Gros 4 run (Baker kick)
 Pittsburgh – Daniel 17 fumble return (kick failed)
 Pittsburgh – J. Bradshaw 82 interception return (Clark kick)
 Pittsburgh – Lind 4 pass from Nelsen (Clark kick)
 Philadelphia – Poage 14 pass from Concannon (Baker kick)

Week 7 (Sunday October 31, 1965): Dallas Cowboys  

at Pitt Stadium, Pittsburgh, Pennsylvania

 Game time:
 Game weather:
 Game attendance: 37,804
 Referee:
 TV announcers:

Scoring Drives:

 Dallas – Smith 2 pass from Meredith (kick failed)
 Pittsburgh – Hoak 2 pass from Nelsen (kick failed)
 Pittsburgh – Ballman 20 pass from Nelsen (kick failed)
 Pittsburgh – Ballman 72 pass from Nelsen (Clark kick)
 Dallas – Gent 8 pass from Meredith (Villanueva kick)
 Pittsburgh – FG Clark 18

Week 8 (Sunday November 7, 1965): St. Louis Cardinals  

at Busch Stadium, St. Louis, Missouri

 Game time:
 Game weather:
 Game attendance: 31,899
 Referee:
 TV announcers:

Scoring Drives:

 Pittsburgh – FG Clark 11
 St. Louis – Triplett 3 run (Bakken kick)
 St. Louis – Randle 15 pass from Johnson (Bakken kick)
 Pittsburgh – Jefferson 50 pass from Nelsen (Clark kick)
 Pittsburgh – Lind 2 run (Clark kick)
 St. Louis – Gambrell 59 pass from Johnson (Bakken kick)

Week 9 (Sunday November 14, 1965): Dallas Cowboys  

at Cotton Bowl, Dallas, Texas

 Game time:
 Game weather:
 Game attendance: 57,293
 Referee:
 TV announcers:

Scoring Drives:

 Pittsburgh – Hoak 3 run (Clark kick)
 Dallas – Clarke 1 pass from Meredith (Villanueva kick)
 Dallas – FG Villanueva 33
 Pittsburgh – FG Clark 32
 Pittsburgh – Folkins 18 fumble return (Clark kick)
 Dallas – Reeves 2 run (Villanueva kick)
 Dallas – Hayes 28 pass from Meredith (Villanueva kick)

Week 10 (Sunday November 21, 1965): Washington Redskins  

at Pitt Stadium, Pittsburgh, Pennsylvania

 Game time:
 Game weather:
 Game attendance: 25,052
 Referee:
 TV announcers:

Scoring Drives:

 Pittsburgh – FG Clark 34
 Washington – Lewis 1 run (Jencks kick)
 Washington – FG Jencks 9
 Washington – Taylor 8 run (Jencks kick)
 Washington – Coia 45 pass from Jurgensen (Jencks kick)
 Washington – Harris 57 punt return (Jencks kick)

Week 11 (Sunday November 28, 1965): Cleveland Browns  

at Pitt Stadium, Pittsburgh, Pennsylvania

 Game time:
 Game weather:
 Game attendance: 42,757
 Referee:
 TV announcers:

Scoring Drives:

 Cleveland – Kelly 56 punt return (Groza kick)
 Cleveland – Brown 2 run (Groza kick)
 Cleveland – Brown 2 run (Groza kick)
 Pittsburgh – Ballman 87 pass from Nelsen (Clark kick)
 Cleveland – Brown 15 run (Groza kick)
 Pittsburgh – Butler 43 pass from Nelsen (Clark kick)
 Cleveland – Brewer 25 pass from Ninowski (Groza kick)
 Pittsburgh – Thomas 80 pass from Nelsen (Clark kick)
 Cleveland – Brown 27 pass from Ninowski (Groza kick)

Week 12 (Sunday December 5, 1965): New York Giants  

at Yankee Stadium, The Bronx, New York

 Game time:
 Game weather:
 Game attendance: 62,735
 Referee:
 TV announcers:

Scoring Drives:

 New York Giants – Shofner 33 pass from Morrall (Timberlake kick)
 Pittsburgh – FG Clark 25
 Pittsburgh – Ballman 1 run (Clark kick)
 New York Giants – Frederickson 13 run (Timberlake kick)
 New York Giants – Frederickson 3 run (Timberlake kick)
 New York Giants – Frederickson 19 pass from Morrall (Timberlake kick)
 New York Giants – Jones 28 pass from Wood (Timberlake kick)

Week 13 (Sunday December 12, 1965): Philadelphia Eagles  

at Pitt Stadium, Pittsburgh, Pennsylvania

 Game time:
 Game weather:
 Game attendance: 22,002
 Referee:
 TV announcers:

Scoring Drives:

 Philadelphia – Gros 2 run (Baker kick)
 Philadelphia – Retzlaff 13 pass from Snead (kick failed)
 Philadelphia – Matson 8 run (Baker kick)
 Philadelphia – Baughan 33 interception return (Baker kick)
 Philadelphia – Nettles 56 interception return (Baker kick)
 Pittsburgh – Ballman 20 pass from Wade (Clark kick)
 Pittsburgh – Woodson 61 interception return (kick failed)
 Philadelphia – Tarasovic 40 interception return (kick failed)
 Philadelphia – Lang 8 run (Baker kick)

Week 14 (December 19, 1965): Washington Redskins  

at D.C. Stadium, Washington, D.C.

 Game time:
 Game weather:
 Game attendance: 49,806
 Referee:
 TV announcers:

Scoring Drives:

 Washington – Lewis 10 pass from Jurgensen (Jencks kick)
 Washington – Harris 34 interception (Jencks kick)
 Pittsburgh – Ballman 2 run (Clark kick)
 Washington – Walters 63 interception return (Jencks kick)
 Pittsburgh – Ballman 44 pass from Wade (Clark kick)
 Washington – Pellegrini 31 fumble return (Jencks kick)
 Washington – Hughley 4 pass from Jurgensen (Jencks kick)

Standings

References

External links
 1965 Pittsburgh Steelers season at Profootballreference.com 
 1965 Pittsburgh Steelers season statistics at jt-sw.com 

Pittsburgh Steelers seasons
Pittsburgh Steelers
Pittsburgh Steel